Coiled-coil domain-containing protein KIAA1826 is a protein that in humans is encoded by the KIAA1826 gene.

References

Further reading